Loukas Karakatsanis (born 22 October 1981 in Livadeia, Greece) is a professional football midfielder who last played for Diagoras F.C. in the Greek second division.

References

External links
Guardian's Stats Centre

1981 births
Living people
Greek footballers
Levadiakos F.C. players
Panetolikos F.C. players
Footballers from Livadeia
Association football midfielders
Association football forwards